Redcrest is a census-designated place in Humboldt County, California. The population was 89 at the 2010 census.

The Redcrest post office was established in 1965.

The greater Redcrest area includes the Holmes flat, Englewood and Larabee areas.

Redcrest is located along the Avenue of the Giants. The ZIP Code is 95569. The community is inside area code 707.

Demographics
At the 2010 census Redcrest had a population of 89. The racial makeup of Redcrest was 73 (82.0%) White, 0 (0.0%) African American, 5 (5.6%) Native American, 0 (0.0%) Asian, 0 (0.0%) Pacific Islander, 3 (3.4%) from other races, and 8 (9.0%) from two or more races. Hispanic or Latino of any race were 4 people (4.5%).

The whole population lived in households, no one lived in non-institutionalized group quarters and no one was institutionalizes

There were 42 households, 9 (21.4%) had children under the age of 18 living in them, 21 (50.0%) were opposite-sex married couples living together, 5 (11.9%) had a female householder with no husband present, 1 (2.4%) had a male householder with no wife present.  There were 6 (14.3%) unmarried opposite-sex partnerships, and 0 (0%) same-sex married couples or partnerships. 12 households (28.6%) were one person and 6 (14.3%) had someone living alone who was 65 or older. The average household size was 2.12.  There were 27 families (64.3% of households); the average family size was 2.41.

The age distribution was 15 people (16.9%) under the age of 18, 1 people (1.1%) aged 18 to 24, 18 people (20.2%) aged 25 to 44, 37 people (41.6%) aged 45 to 64, and 18 people (20.2%) who were 65 or older.  The median age was 50.8 years. For every 100 females, there were 71.2 males.  For every 100 females age 18 and over, there were 89.7 males.

There were 54 housing units at an average density of ,of which 42 were occupied, 29 (69.0%) by the owners and 13 (31.0%) by renters.  The homeowner vacancy rate was 3.3%; the rental vacancy rate was 7.1%.  56 people (62.9% of the population) lived in owner-occupied housing units and 33 people (37.1%) lived in rental housing units.

Politics

See also

References

Census-designated places in Humboldt County, California
Census-designated places in California